Stridsvagn m/37 (Strv m/37) was a Swedish-built version of the Czechoslovak ČKD AH-IV tankette.

History 
The AH-IV was popular with Romania and Iran, and after a successful demonstration to Swedish authorities, during winter conditions in the Krkonoše Mountains, Sweden ordered 48 AH-IV-Sv in 1937. Two of these were built in Czechoslovakia; the other 46 were built as the Strv m/37 under license by Jungner in Oskarshamn, with AB Volvo providing a more powerful engine, transmission, and tracks, the armor was made by Avesta. ČKD supplied most of the other components after building one prototype. The tankette was heavily modified, including the removal of the driver's machine gun. This variant was heavier and larger than the AH-IV. On the turret were mounted two Swedish-made machine guns, the 8 mm Ksp m/36 strv, and a commander's cupola. Inside the vehicle was room for a radio and the ammunition. In November 1938, the final components were shipped.

Production 
A total of 48 of these vehicles were delivered to the Swedish army in 1938 and 1939.

Service 
The Strv m/37s were first issued to the 1st Armored Battalion. Between 1943—44, were transferred to the newly formed armored brigades. Subsequently, the tankettes were in service with the infantry regiments I 2, I 9, I 10 and P 1 G Armored Company on Gotland. The Strv m/37s lasted in service on Gotland until 1953, when they were withdrawn from service.

Survivors
Eight of these tanks survive to this day, four in running order, of which one is in the Regimental Museum Strangnas, Sweden.

Comparable vehicles

 Germany: Panzer I
 Italy: L3/33 • L3/35
 Japan: Type 94
 Poland: TK-3 and TKS
 Romania: R-1 (also an AH-IV version)
 Soviet Union: T-27 • T-37A • T-38
 United Kingdom: Light Tank Mk VI

Notes

References

Tanks of Sweden
World War II tanks of Sweden
Tanks of the interwar period
Military vehicles introduced in the 1930s